Jesse Timmermans (born 17 March 1989) is a Dutch tennis player.

Timmermans has a career high ATP singles ranking of 1295 achieved on 27 November 2017. He also has a career high ATP doubles ranking of 1199 achieved on 27 November 2017.

Timmermans made his ATP main draw debut at the 2018 ABN AMRO World Tennis Tournament in the doubles draw partnering Jasper Smit.

External links

1989 births
Living people
Dutch male tennis players
People from Heusden
Sportspeople from North Brabant
21st-century Dutch people